The June 2008 San Francisco general elections were held on June 3, 2008 in San Francisco, California. The elections included the primaries of two seats in the United States House of Representatives, one seat to the California State Senate, two seats to the California State Assembly, seats to various parties' county central committees, one seat to the San Francisco County Superior Court, two California ballot propositions, and eight San Francisco ballot measures.

Superior Court 
As no candidate had more than 50% of the votes, a runoff election was held between the two highest vote-getting candidates in the November 2008 election.

Propositions 
Note: "City" refers to the San Francisco municipal government.

Proposition A 

Proposition A would allow the San Francisco Unified School District to levy a $198 tax on every parcel of property to pay for educational programs, increased salaries for teachers, teacher compensation for hard-to-work schools and subject areas, and increase teacher and classroom resources. This proposition required a two-thirds majority to pass.

Proposition B 

Proposition B would increase the number of years that new City employees and certain employees of the School Board, Superior Court, and the Community College District to qualify for employer-funded retiree health benefits, establish a Retiree Health Care Trust Fund to fund such costs, and increase retirement benefits and COLAs for some employees.

Proposition C 

Proposition C would prohibit City employees who have committed a crime of moral turpitude involving their employment from drawing funds from the San Francisco Employees' Retirement System that came from employer contributions.

Proposition D 

Proposition D would make it City policy that membership of City boards and commissions reflect the contributions of persons of both genders and all races, ethnicities, sexual orientations, and types of disabilities, and urge City agencies and officials to support the nomination, appointment, and confirmation of such candidates to City boards and commissions.

Proposition E 

Proposition E would require the Board of Supervisors to approve mayoral appointments to the City Public Utilities Commission, and require that such candidates meet certain qualifications.

Proposition F 

Proposition F would require that 50% of housing units in the Candlestick Point and Hunters Point Shipyard development plans consist of affordable housing, that the Alice Griffith projects be replaced on a unit-by-unit basis, and that the Board of Supervisors reject all plans that do not include such requirements. This was submitted to the ballot to counter Proposition G below.

Proposition G 

Proposition G would make it City policy to encourage timely development of Candlestick Point and Hunters Point Shipyard, including a new 49ers stadium or equivalent, that the City would transfer park land for such development if replaced by new public parks elsewhere, and that 1997 Propositions D and F be repealed. This was submitted to the ballot to counter Proposition F above.

Proposition H 

Proposition H would prohibit City elected officials, candidates, and political action committees that they control from soliciting or accepting contributions from contractors who have a contract pending or recently approved by the official or a board on which the official sits.

External links 
 San Francisco Department of Elections
 City and County of San Francisco Consolidated Statewide Direct Primary - June 3, 2008 Statement of Votes

San Francisco 06
2008 06
Elections 06
San Francisco 06
2000s in San Francisco